Yangzhou or Yang Prefecture (揚州) was a zhou (prefecture) in imperial China, centering on modern Yangzhou, Jiangsu, China. It existed (intermittently) from 589 until 1912. 

In the 10th century, during Wu and Southern Tang it was known as Jiangdu Prefecture (江都府).

The modern prefecture-level city, established in 1949, retains its name.

Population
In the early 1100s during the Song dynasty, there were 56,485 households and 107,579 people.

See also
Guangling Commandery

References

 
 

Prefectures of the Ming dynasty
Prefectures of the Qing dynasty
Prefectures of the Yuan dynasty
Prefectures of the Tang dynasty
Prefectures of the Sui dynasty
Prefectures of Later Zhou
Prefectures of the Song dynasty
Former prefectures in Jiangsu